Kisi may refer to:

 Kisi people of Tanzania
 Kisi language (Tanzania)
 Kisi, Kenya, a town in Nyanza Province
 Kisi, Nigeria, a town in Oyo State
 Kissi language of Guinea, Sierra Leone, and Liberia in West Africa
 KISI - Kiev Engineering and Structural Institute (Russian: Киевский инженерно-строительный институт, КИСИ)